Pavol Červenák (born 1 July 1987), is a professional tennis player from Slovak Republic.

2012
Pavol Cervenak defeated Tommy Haas in the Stuttgart claycourt tournament at the second round stage.(6–4, 6–4).

ATP Challenger and ITF Futures finals

Singles: 16 (8–8)

Doubles: 7 (3–4)

Performance timeline

Singles

References

External links
 
 
 

Slovak male tennis players
Tennis players from Bratislava
1987 births
Living people